Víctor Pizarro was a Chilean footballer.

Honours

Club
Unión Española
 Primera División de Chile (1): 1977

Individual
 Primera División de Chile Top-Scorer (1): 1975

References

External links
 

Chilean Primera División players
O'Higgins F.C. footballers
Santiago Morning footballers
Unión Española footballers
Deportes Temuco footballers
Association football forwards
1950 births
Chilean footballers
Chile international footballers
Living people